Isle au Haut Light, also called Robinson Point Light, is a lighthouse located at Robinson Point in Isle au Haut, Maine. The lighthouse was established in 1907.

History
The lighthouse tower and surrounding buildings at Isle au Haut Light Station were built in 1907 by the United States Army Corps of Engineers
at a  site at Robinson Point purchased from Charles E. Robinson.
The keeper's quarters are a two-and-a-half-story frame and stucco Victorian house connected to the tower by a catwalk.
A boathouse, oil house, and storage shed were also built at the station.

The lighthouse was automated in 1934 and the government sold the property except the tower back to Robinson. The Robinson family used the property as a summer home until they sold it to Jeff and Judi Burke in 1986. The Burkes converted the keeper's quarters into a bed and breakfast called "The Keeper's House," which they operated until 2007.

Isle au Haut Light was added to the National Register of Historic Places as "Isle au Haut Light Station" in 1988. The Coast Guard transferred the lighthouse to the Town of Isle au Haut in 1998 under the Maine Lights Program and the tower was completely restored in 1999.

The lighthouse remains in service as of 2008. The current optic for the light is a  solar-powered lens which flashes red every four seconds with a white sector covering the safe channel. The original fourth order Fresnel lens is at the Maine Lighthouse Museum in Rockland, Maine.

See also
National Register of Historic Places listings in Knox County, Maine

References

Lighthouses completed in 1907
Lighthouses on the National Register of Historic Places in Maine
Lighthouses in Knox County, Maine
Penobscot Bay
National Register of Historic Places in Knox County, Maine